Mike Blum (October 24, 1942 –  December 16, 2008) was a Canadian football player in the Canadian Football League. He played five seasons for the Toronto Argonauts between 1968 and 1974, and in 1972 earned a Grey Cup ring with the Hamilton Tiger-Cats. He died of a cerebral hemorrhage in Toronto on December 15, 2008

References

Further reading

External links
 Mike Blum Ti-Cats All-time roster

1943 births
2008 deaths
Hamilton Tiger-Cats players
Ottawa Rough Riders players
Players of Canadian football from Ontario
Canadian football people from Ottawa
Toronto Argonauts players
Lisgar Collegiate Institute alumni